Crest FM is an indigenous radio station situated at Alagbaka, Akure, Ondo State, Nigeria. The radio station was founded on April 6, 2020. Its Chief Operating Officer is Mr. Adeolu Gboyega.

History 
It formerly operates on 87.7 MHz frequency but was later changed to 106.1  MHz frequency on December, 2021 with effect on January 1, 2022. It is the only station that is on air all through the weekend non-stop in its 72hour special weekend broadcast and was once the No. 1 radio station that signs on the airwaves in Ondo State.  It is now the last on the dial in the Ondo State airwaves.

References 

Radio stations in Nigeria